Nicolas Hyeronimus ( – ) was a pioneering innkeeper, merchant, pastoralist and politician in colonial New South Wales, Australia.

Born in Wallonia (a region of modern Belgium), Hyeronimus arrived in New South Wales in about 1840.  In 1842, he established the Lion of Waterloo, the first inn at Montefiores, near present-day Wellington, in the central west of New South Wales.  He later built the first house in Wellington, and established the Carriers Arms, the first inn at the present site of Dubbo, New South Wales.

In about 1854, Hyeronimus built the homestead The Meeting of the Waters (now named Glenrock), on land west of the Bell River near Wellington.

On 15 June 1859, Hyeronimus was elected to the New South Wales Legislative Assembly as the inaugural member for the electoral district of Wellington. However, he died in Sydney in 1860, after serving only just over one year in office.

References

 

Members of the New South Wales Legislative Assembly
1808 births
1860 deaths
Belgian emigrants to Australia
People from Dinant
19th-century Australian politicians